Jimmy Sierra (born 19 July 1949) is a Colombian sprinter. He competed in the men's 100 metres at the 1968 Summer Olympics.

References

1949 births
Living people
Athletes (track and field) at the 1968 Summer Olympics
Athletes (track and field) at the 1972 Summer Olympics
Colombian male sprinters
Olympic athletes of Colombia
Competitors at the 1970 Central American and Caribbean Games
Athletes (track and field) at the 1971 Pan American Games
Central American and Caribbean Games silver medalists for Colombia
Sportspeople from Cali
Central American and Caribbean Games medalists in athletics
Pan American Games competitors for Colombia
20th-century Colombian people